Human, Space, Time and Human is a 2018 South Korean drama film directed by Kim Ki-duk.

Plot
The film follows people of various ages and occupations traveling on a warship, and explores the limits of humanity and morality.

Cast

Mina Fujii as Eve
Jang Keun-suk as Adam
Ahn Sung-ki as The old man
Lee Sung-jae as Adam's father
Ryoo Seung-bum as Gangster boss
Sung Ki-youn as Captain
Joe Odagiri as Eve's boyfriend
Woo Ki-hoon as Ki-seok
Kim Dong-chan
Ahn Philip 
Lee Yoo-joon
Tae Hang-ho
Son Fe-ya
Park Se-in

Production 
Principal photography began in May 2017 and ended in early July 2017.

Reception
On review aggregator website Rotten Tomatoes, the film has an approval rating of  based on  reviews.

See also 
Ages of Man

References

External links

2018 films
South Korean drama films
Films directed by Kim Ki-duk
2018 drama films
2010s South Korean films